German submarine U-1021 was a Type VIIC/41 U-boat of Nazi Germany's Kriegsmarine during World War II.

Laid down on 6 May 1943 at the Blohm & Voss yard in Hamburg, the submarine was launched on 13 April 1944, and commissioned on 25 May 1944, under the command of Oberleutnant zur See William Holpert.

Design
German Type VIIC/41 submarines were preceded by the heavier Type VIIC submarines. U-1021 had a displacement of  when at the surface and  while submerged. She had two shafts and two  propellers.

U-1021 was fitted with five  torpedo tubes (four fitted at the bow and one at the stern), fourteen torpedoes, one  SK C/35 naval gun, (220 rounds), one  Flak M42 and two  C/30 anti-aircraft guns. The boat had a complement of between forty-four and sixty.

Sensors

Passive sonar
U-1021 was one of only ten Type VIIC's to be fitted with a Balkongerät (literally 'Balcony apparatus or equipment'). The Balkongerät was used on U-boats (and ). The Balkongerät was standard on the Type XXI and the Type XXIII. Nonetheless, it was also fitted to several Type IXs and one Type X. The Balkongerät was an improved version of Gruppenhorchgerät (GHG) (group listening device). The GHG had 24 hydrophones, the Balkongerät had 48 hydrophones and improved electronics, which enabled more accurate readings to be taken.

Service history
U-1021 served with 31st U-boat Flotilla, a training unit, and later with 11th U-boat Flotilla from 1 December 1944 until its disappearance in March 1945.

Patrol and loss
U-1021 sailed from Bergen on 20 February 1945 and headed for the waters around Land's End.

Discovery
Further research by Innes McCartney led to the conclusion that all three submarines were sunk in the Bristol Channel by a deep-trap minefield.

The attack of 30 March 1945 previously assumed to have sunk U-1021 is now believed to have sunk .

See also
 Battle of the Atlantic (1939-1945)

References

Bibliography

External links

German Type VIIC/41 submarines
U-boats commissioned in 1944
World War II submarines of Germany
World War II shipwrecks in the Celtic Sea
U-boats sunk in 1945
U-boats sunk by mines
U-boats sunk by British warships
1944 ships
Ships built in Hamburg
Ships lost with all hands
Maritime incidents in March 1945